Breskarvet is a mountain ridge in Nathorst Land at Spitsbergen, Svalbard. It has a length of about six kilometres. It is situated north of the mountain range of Törnbohmfjella, and south of Krylen. Surrounding glaciers are Martinbreen, Richterbreen, Frysjabreen, Skarvisen and Greenbreen.

References

Mountains of Spitsbergen